Ffra Johan Basset (modernised as Fra Joan Basset) was a Catalan author of twenty verses and a prose Letovari. His work is preserved in the Cançoner Vega-Aguiló (1420–30). He was probably active in the early years (1416–21) of the reign of Alfonso V. His religious title, fra ("brother"), has led to speculation that he was a knight of the Order of Saint John of Jerusalem (based on an unsourced assertion of Jordi Rubió). Basset preached at Cervera during Lent in 1424. It is recorded that he was a member of the "Order of Santa Anna". This is probably a reference to the convent of Santa Anna at Barcelona, which was originally a house of the Order of the Holy Sepulchre under the guidance of the Patriarch of Jerusalem. Cohabitating at Santa Anna was a group of Brothers of Penitence and some Augustinian canons of Santa Eulàlia del Camp (since 1293). In 1420 the friars and canons passed into the Casa del Sant Sepulcre de Santa Anna.

Basset was a competent and original poet; his poetry diverse in form and style, his themes both religious and amorous. Besides his religious and amorous poetry, Basset wrote three unique pieces: a planh, a piece entitled , and another called . Basset's Letovari (electuarium) is a manual for curing the love-sick, dedicated to Guerau de Massanet. It has much in common with the Consolació of Luys Ycart and the Medicina of Bernat Metge.

Basset's religious verse consists in four poems about the Virgin Mary. His  was his first published work: it was edited by Manuel Milà i Fontanals and published in his  (1886–93).

In the latter, each stanza begins with a line introducing the Mayres de Dieu followed by six lines beginning  ("is certainly more worthy") and ending with the refrain  ("and nothing is worth as much as your court"). The structure of this piece and its contents suggest it is a religious plazer, a genre introduced to Catalonia by Cerverí de Girona over a century earlier and Catalanised by Pere March within Basset's lifetime.

Basset's love poetry fits within the tradition of courtly love and of the troubadours. This is obvious when he refers to himself as a "prisoner" of his lady and in his use of feudal and military terminology to describe their relationship.

List of poems
 (or belha)

 (or ) 

 (or )

Notes

External links
Incipitario di Fra Joan Basset, with links to edited original-language texts of his twenty pieces

Poets from Catalonia
Medieval Catalan-language writers
15th-century Catalan people